The OneAircraft One is a Slovenian light-sport aircraft (LSA) and certified light aircraft designed by Iztok Šalamon and produced by OneAircraft (One Pro, d.o.o.) of Celje. The aircraft is supplied complete and ready-to-fly.

OneAircraft was founded in 2014 as a joint venture between C2P d.o.o. and Kops pro d.o.o. It was shutdown in 2019 and a new company formed to produce the design, Gogetair Aviation.

Design and development
The One was designed to comply with the US LSA rules as a two-seater and the European rules as a certified 3-4 seat EASA CS-VLA category aircraft. It features a cantilever low-wing, an enclosed cabin with two-seats-in-side-by-side configuration or four seats, all accessed by doors, fixed tricycle landing gear and a single engine in tractor configuration.

The aircraft is made from carbon fibre and uses the wings and tail surfaces derived from the Shark.Aero Shark. Its  span wing mounts flaps. The horizontal stabilizer is low-mounted. The standard engine used is the  Rotax 912ULS, four-stroke powerplant.

The company has indicated that they expect LSA acceptance in 2017, but as of March 2017, the design does not yet appear on the Federal Aviation Administration's list of approved special light-sport aircraft.

Variants
One LSA
Model with two seats and a  gross weight under development in 2017 for the LSA category
One 2+2
Model under development in 2015 with four seats and a  gross weight under development for the certified CS-VLA category
Certified One
Model under development with three seats and a  gross weight under development for the certified CS-VLA category
Non-Certified One
Factory built experimental model with a  gross weight in production in 2017. The company indicates that they can assist buyers of this model to register it in Slovenia.

Specifications (One 2+2)

References

External links

One
2010s Slovenian ultralight aircraft
Light-sport aircraft
Single-engined tractor aircraft